Mahant Ramchandra Das Paramhans (1913-2003) was head of the Ram Janmabhoomi Nyas in Ayodhya. He was born as Chandreshwar Lodhi into a prosperous Brahmin family in what is now the Indian state of Bihar. After his death, Mahant Dharam Das succeeded him as his legal heir.

References

1913 births
2003 deaths
Indian Hindus
Hindutva
Ayodhya dispute